Idriss Déby's government governed Chad from 1990 to 2021. It ended with the death of the president in 2021.

Evolution 
The government was reshuffled for the first time on 18 June 2018 and a second time on 9 November 2018.

Collapse 
The government collapsed in April 2021 when the President was killed by rebels from the Front for Change and Concord in Chad (FACT).

References 

Government of Chad
1990 establishments in Chad
Cabinets established in 1990
Cabinets disestablished in 2021
2021 disestablishments in Africa